Archivides "Archie" Kalokerinos (28 September 1927 – 1 March 2012) was an Australian physician and anti-vaccination advocate. He advocated alternative medicine, including orthomolecular medicine and a form of megavitamin therapy in which high doses of vitamin C are used to treat nearly all ailments, including any virus. He became notable for treating indigenous Australians with high intravenous doses of vitamin C, a practice criticized by the medical community for being unsupported by data.

Early life 
Archivides Kalokerinos was born in Glen Innes, Australia, on 28 September 1927. He earned his MB BS degree from Sydney University in 1951 and then spent six years in England. He held the position of medical superintendent at a hospital in Collarenebri, New South Wales.

Anti-vaccination activism 
Kalokerinos was affiliated with Australian Vaccination Network, an anti-vaccination lobbyist group. As a speaker for the group, Kalokerinos spread numerous conspiracy theories about vaccines, including that vaccines were used to spread HIV/AIDS in Nigeria as part of a deliberate genocide perpetrated by the World Health Organization and the Save The Children Fund, that they were used by the Australian government to kill a large number of Aboriginal Australians, and that the United States planned to exterminate criminals by encouraging them to get vaccinated. He has said that the deliberate mass killings perpetrated by the World Health Organization and the Save The Children Fund "put Hitler and Stalin in the shade". None of these claims are supported by scientific evidence.

Publications 
Books
Vitamin C Nature's Miraculous Healing Missile!, G. Dettman, A. Kalokerinos, Ashgate Publishing (1993) 
Every Second Child Archie Kalokerinos (foreword by Linus Pauling), Keats Publishing (1981)  
Alcohol and Australian Aborigines, A. Kalokerinos, Aboriginal Medical Service Information Service, Redfern, NSW (1977) 
Ascorbic acid, the eye, diabetes and herpes, A. Kalokerinos, Aboriginal Medical Service Information Service, Redfern, NSW (1977) 
Journal articles
Kalokerinos A, Dettman I, Dettman G. (1983) Is calcium ascorbate preferable to sodium ascorbate? Australas Nurses J. Mar;12(1):9. 
Kalokerinos A, Dettman I, Dettman G. (1982) How much vitamin C should I take. Australas Nurses J. Jul;11(6):8-9.  
Kalokerinos A, Dettman I, Dettman G. (1982) Ascorbate—the proof of the pudding! A selection of case histories responding to ascorbate. Australas Nurses J. Mar;11(2):18-21. 
Kalokerinos A, Dettman G. (1981) Rubella immunisation, a tangle of absurdities and some comments. Australas Nurses J. Nov;10(11):3-6.    
Kalokerinos A, Dettman G. (1981) On your metal? Amazing zinc! Australas Nurses J. Oct;10(10):22. 
Kalokerinos A, Dettman G. (1981) "Mumps" the word but you have yet another vaccine deficiency. Australas Nurses J. Jun;10(6):17-8. 
Kalokerinos A, Dettman I, Dettman G. (1981) Vitamin C: the dangers of calcium and safety of sodium ascorbate. Australas Nurses J.  Mar;10(3):22. 
Dettman G, Kalokerinos A. (1980) Aboriginal health: the gentle art of deception. Australas Nurses J. Dec;10(1):14-5. 
Kalokerinos A, Dettman G. (1980) Viral vaccines vital or vulnerable. Australas Nurses J. Aug;9(9):27-32. 
Kalokerinos A, Dettman G. (1980) Joggers - beware. Australas Nurses J. Jul;9(8):22. 
Cilento P, Kalokerinos A, (1980) Dettman I, Dettman G. Venomous bites and vitamin C status. Australas Nurses J. May;9(6):19. 
Knafelc D, Kalokerinos A, Dettmann G.  (1980) Disease etiology - a shock therapy. Australas Nurses J. Jan-Feb;9(3):18-20. 
Kalokerinos A, Dettman G. (1979) On new ideas and an U.S. experience. Australas Nurses J. Nov;9(1):22-6. 
Kalokerinos A, Dettman G. (1979) Year of the child: don't be beguiled. Australas Nurses J. Mar;8(6):22-4. 
Kalokerinos A, Dettman G. (1978) Vaccines: "who" benefits? Australas Nurses J. Jul;7(11):15-6. 
Kalokerinos A, Dettman G. (1978) Does rubella vaccine protect? Australas Nurses J. May;7(9):1-4. 
Kalokerinos A. (1978) The sudden infant death syndrome. Part 2. Definition. Further clinical observations. Australas Nurses J. Mar;7(7):6-8.  
Kalokerinos A. (1977) Australian Aboriginal health and vitamin C. Australas Nurses J. Dec;7(5):7. 
Kalokerinos A, Dettman G. (1977) Vitamin C and the significance of that "wasted spillover". Australas Nurses J. Oct;7(3):19. 
Kalokerinos A. (1977) Aboriginal health. Australas Nurses J. Sep;7(2):23-4, 30. 
Kalokerinos A, Dettman G. (1977) The efficiency of immunisations. Australas Nurses J. Apr;6(9):15. 
Kalokerinos A, Dettman G. (1976) Sudden death in infancy syndrome in Western Australia. Med J Aust. Jul 3;2(1):31-2. 
Kalokerinos A. (1976) Letter: Severe measles in Vietnam. Med J Aust. Apr 17;1(16):593-4. 
Kalokerinos A. (1974) Poor black health, bad white attitudes. Aust Nurses J. Apr;3(9):29-31. 
Kalokerinos A. (1973) Aboriginal infant health and mortality rates. Med J Aust. 3 March 1973;1(9):462-3 
Kalokerinos A. (1971) The Aboriginal infant mortality rate. Med J Aust. August 21;2(8):445-6. 
Kalokerinos A. (1969) Some aspects of aboriginal infant mortality. Med J Aust. January 25;1(4):185-7 
Bryson AM, Kalokerinos A. (1970) Sudden unexpected deaths in infancy. Med J Aust. August 8;2(6):292.

See also 
Vaccine hesitancy

References

1927 births
2012 deaths
20th-century Australian medical doctors
Australian anti-vaccination activists
Australian people of Greek descent
Orthomolecular medicine advocates
Pseudoscientific diet advocates